Stephen Chubin, also known as "Chube" (born February 8, 1944) is a retired American professional basketball player.

College career
Born in New York City, Chubin played college basketball at the University of Rhode Island, with the Rhode Island Rams, where he became the school's all-time leading scorer. He was inducted into the University of Rhode Island Athletics Hall of Fame, in 1981.

He won a gold medal with Team USA in basketball at the 1965 Maccabiah Games in Israel, along with Tal Brody, Ronald Green, and Ron Watts.

He played on the United States basketball team that won a gold medal at the 1965 Maccabiah Games in Israel, along with Tal Brody, Ronald Green,

Professional career
Chubin was selected by the San Francisco Warriors, in the 3rd round (23rd pick overall), of the 1966 NBA draft.

Chubin spent the 1966–67 season playing in the Italian League with Olimpia Milano, which placed second in the FIBA European Champions Cup (EuroLeague), behind Real Madrid. Chubin was the top scorer in the EuroLeague Finals, with 34 points.

Chubin played for the Anaheim Amigos (1967–68), and by most accounts, was the most popular player with the team's fans.  Chubin averaged 18.2 points per game during his first ABA season.  Also, during his first year with the Amigos, Chubin ranked second in the league in assists per game (4.7).
 
Chubin later played for the Los Angeles Stars, Minnesota Pipers, Indiana Pacers, and New York Nets (1968–69), the Pittsburgh Pipers, Pacers, and Kentucky Colonels (1969–70), in the American Basketball Association (ABA), in 226 games. He also played in the Israeli League with Maccabi Tel Aviv.

See also
List of select Jewish basketball players

References

External links
Sports-Reference Profile

Safsal.co.il Profile

1944 births
Living people
American expatriate basketball people in Italy
American men's basketball players
Anaheim Amigos players
Basketball players from New York City
Forest Hills High School (New York) alumni
Hamden Bics players
Indiana Pacers players
Israeli Basketball Premier League players
Jewish American sportspeople
Jewish men's basketball players
Competitors at the 1965 Maccabiah Games
Maccabiah Games gold medalists for the United States
Maccabiah Games medalists in basketball
Kentucky Colonels players
Los Angeles Stars players
Maccabi Tel Aviv B.C. players
Minnesota Pipers players
New York Nets players
Olimpia Milano players
Pittsburgh Pipers players
Point guards
Rhode Island Rams men's basketball players
San Francisco Warriors draft picks
Small forwards
Shooting guards
21st-century American Jews